Zhao Baofang (born 12 August 1993) is a Chinese female track cyclist. She competed in the team pursuit event at the 2014 and 2015 UCI Track Cycling World Championships.

Major Results
2014
1st  Team Pursuit, Asian Track Championships (with Huang Dongyan, Jiang Wenwen and Jing Yali)
1st  Team Pursuit, Asian Games (with Huang Dongyan, Jiang Wenwen and Jing Yali)
2015
1st  Team Pursuit, Asian Track Championships (with Huang Dongyan, Jiang Wenwen and Jing Yali)

References

1993 births
Living people
Chinese track cyclists
Chinese female cyclists
Cyclists from Henan
Asian Games medalists in cycling
Cyclists at the 2014 Asian Games
Olympic cyclists of China
Cyclists at the 2016 Summer Olympics
Asian Games gold medalists for China
Medalists at the 2014 Asian Games
21st-century Chinese women